The Plains is a town in Fauquier County, Virginia, United States. The population was 245 as of the 2020 census, up from 217 at the 2010 census. It is centered on the intersection of VA 55 (John Marshall Highway) and VA 245 (Old Tavern Road). The town of The Plains is situated off I-66. As of 2022, the mayor of The Plains is Lori Sisson.

History
In the 1700s, the Virginia Colony progressively expanded westward and allowed Europeans to begin to construct settlements in the area. Before and during the Civil War, the area was called "White Plains" on maps and a Post Office was named "The Plains" in 1831. A two-story house, with a blacksmith's shop above, was built in 1852. During the Civil War, John S. Mosby and his Mosby's Raiders used The Plains as part of their raiding area they controlled. The Plains was incorporated as a town in 1910.

Geography
The Plains is located in northeastern Fauquier County at  (38.862698, -77.775464). VA 55 leads southeast  to Gainesville and west  to Marshall. VA 245 leads southwest  to I-66 at Exit 31. I-66 leads east  to Washington, D.C. and west  to Front Royal.

Transportation
Highways directly serving The Plains include Virginia State Route 55 and Virginia State Route 245. SR 55 extends east and west, serving as a local service road to nearby I-66, while SR 245 provides the most direct connection to I-66 from The Plains.

Demographics

As of the census of 2000, there were 266 people, 110 households, and 70 families residing in the town. The population density was 1,035.1 people per square mile (395.0/km2). There were 118 housing units at an average density of 459.2 per square mile (175.2/km2). The racial makeup of the town was 89.85% White and 10.15% African American. Hispanic or Latino of any race were 0.38% of the population (which is to say, one of the 266 persons counted in the 2000 census self-reported as Hispanic or Latino).

There were 110 households, out of which 25.5% had children under the age of 18 living with them, 44.5% were married couples living together, 14.5% had a female householder with no husband present, and 35.5% were non-families. 31.8% of all households were made up of individuals, and 10.9% had someone living alone who was 65 years of age or older. The average household size was 2.42 and the average family size was 3.01.

In the town, the population was spread out, with 21.1% under the age of 18, 5.6% from 18 to 24, 32.0% from 25 to 44, 26.3% from 45 to 64, and 15.0% who were 65 years of age or older. The median age was 42 years. For every 100 females, there were 91.4 males. For every 100 females age 18 and over, there were 85.8 males.

The median income for a household in the town was $43,750, and the median income for a family was $45,313. Males had a median income of $41,250 versus $33,542 for females. The per capita income for the town was $27,909. About 13.7% of families and 14.1% of the population were below the poverty line, including 11.1% of those under the age of eighteen and 14.8% of those 65 or over.

Attractions

The Plains is home to Great Meadow, a large open-air and open-field facility that hosts several large events throughout the year, such as the Virginia Gold Cup steeplechase horse race, which attracts over 50,000 guests on the first Saturday of each May, as well as being the home of the Team America Rocketry Challenge held in the same month.

Archwood Green Barns Farmer's Market features fresh, home made and local products. Hours are Sunday, 10:00 a.m. to 3:00 p.m. beginning the last Sunday in April through the 2nd Sunday in November. It is open the first two Sundays in December for the "Christmas on the Farm" show.

A museum exhibit, "Footprint to Change", is located at 4243 Loudoun Avenue near the train tracks that go through town. The building houses the Afro-American Historical Association of Fauquier County offices, library and archives as well as the museum.

The evangelist William Broaddus, founder of Southwestern Seminary in Louisville, Kentucky, was pastor there in the 1830s. His nephew John Broadus is often called "the father of homiletics" (preaching).

Wakefield School, a pre-school through Grade 12 independent school, is located just south of the town limits.

Actor Robert Duvall once owned a restaurant in The Plains called "The Rail Stop", named after the Norfolk Southern B-Line, which runs through the town. He still makes his residence north of town at his  Byrnley Farm.
The town is also home to a seasonal corn maze owned and operated by a family in Charlottesville.

The National Association of Rocketry held NARAM-50 there in the summer of 2008.

The Masonic lodge was organized on a site near the present post office. The Plains Lodge U.D. held its first meeting on December 29, 1898, and continued to work "Under Dispensation" until the Grand Lodge of Virginia met in Alexandria on December 15, 1899, and issued the lodge a charter under the name of Cochran Lodge No. 271.

Beverley Mill was listed on the National Register of Historic Places in 1972, and most of the town was listed as The Plains Historic District in 2014.

Climate
The climate in this area is characterized by hot, humid summers and generally mild to cool winters.  According to the Köppen Climate Classification system, The Plains has a humid subtropical climate, abbreviated "Cfa" on climate maps.

Other photos

See also
National Register of Historic Places listings in Fauquier County, Virginia
Virginia Plain

References

External links

Town of The Plains official website
virginia.org website
Great Meadows
Virginia Gold Cup
Fauquier County tourism website
Cochran Lodge No. 271 A.F. & A.M.

The
The
The